Barry Maguire may refer to:
 Barry Maguire (footballer, born 1989), Dutch footballer
 Barry Maguire (footballer, born 1998), Scottish footballer

See also
 Barry McGuire, American singer-songwriter